Symplocos breedlovei is a species of plant in the family Symplocaceae. It is endemic to Mexico.

References

breedlovei
Endemic flora of Mexico
Endangered biota of Mexico
Endangered plants
Taxonomy articles created by Polbot